Vladislav Dragojlović (born March 6, 1979) is a Serbian former professional basketball player. He is a 2.07 m tall center who last played for Al Kuwait.

References

External links
 Vladislav Dragojlović at asiabasket.com
 Vladislav Dragojlović at beobasket.net
 Vladislav Dragojlović at tblstat.net

1979 births
Living people
Sportspeople from Užice
Serbian men's basketball players
KK Budućnost players
KK Crvena zvezda players
KK Lions/Swisslion Vršac players
KK Radnički Kragujevac (2009–2014) players
KK Sloga players
OKK Beograd players
Panionios B.C. players
PBC Lokomotiv-Kuban players
Serbian expatriate basketball people in Russia
Serbian expatriate basketball people in Saudi Arabia
Serbian expatriate basketball people in Greece
Serbian expatriate basketball people in Montenegro
Serbian expatriate basketball people in Kuwait
Serbian expatriate basketball people in Turkey
Serbian expatriate basketball people in Ukraine
ABA League players
Centers (basketball)